Sinita may refer to :

 Titular see of Sinita, former Catholic diocese in Italy
 Sinitta Malone, American-British singer